Gunnar Örn Tynes is a founding member of the Icelandic experimental band múm. He is also a producer and a recording engineer.

References

Gunnar Orn Tynes
Living people
1979 births